is a railway station located in the city of Kitakami, Iwate Prefecture, Japan, operated by the East Japan Railway Company (JR East)

Lines
Ezuriko Station is served by the Kitakami Line, and is located 5.2 km from the terminus of the line at Kitakami Station.

Station layout
The station has one side platform serving a single bi-directional track. The station is unattended.

History
Ezuriko Station opened on April 15, 1923. The station was absorbed into the JR East network upon the privatization of the Japan National Railways (JNR) on April 1, 1987.

Surrounding area
 
Tohoku Expressway
Ezuriko Post Office

See also
 List of railway stations in Japan

References

External links
 

Railway stations in Iwate Prefecture
Kitakami Line
Railway stations in Japan opened in 1923
Kitakami, Iwate
Stations of East Japan Railway Company